is a Japanese professional golfer, currently playing on the Japan Golf Tour.

Suzuki was born in Gifu Prefecture. He turned professional in 1990.

Suzuki won his first title on the Japan Golf Tour in 1993, and would win consistently between then and 2004.

Suzuki qualified for his second major championship in 1998 at The Open Championship after a win in Japan at the Sapporo Tokyu Open. He missed the cut. He also played in the 2002 Open Championship, but missed the 36-hole cut there, too.

Suzuki ended a five-year winless drought in Japan in 2009 with a five stroke win in October at the mynavi ABC Championship.

Suzuki has earned over 753,000,000 Yen in his career on the Japan Golf Tour, which is equivalent to over $8,200,000.

He is the father of two children, one of whom is Airi Suzuki, a Japanese pop singer.

Professional wins (17)

Japan Golf Tour wins (8)

*Note: The 2004 Acom International was shortened to 54 holes due to rain.

Japan Golf Tour playoff record (1–4)

Japan Challenge Tour wins (3)

Other wins (1)
1994 Sanko Grand Summer Championship

Japan PGA Senior Tour wins (5)
2018 Fukuoka Senior Open Golf Tournament, Elite Grip Senior Open Golf, Iwasaki Shiratsuyu Senior Golf Tournament
2020 100th Anniversary of the Birth of Professional Golfers ISPS Handa Corona Ni Katsu
2021 Iwasaki Shiratsuyu Senior Golf Tournament

Team appearances
World Cup (representing Japan): 1994
Dynasty Cup (representing Japan): 2003, 2005

References

External links

Japan Golf Tour golfers
Japanese male golfers
Sportspeople from Gifu Prefecture
1966 births
Living people